Propositional calculus is a branch of logic.  It is also called propositional logic, statement logic, sentential calculus, sentential logic, or sometimes zeroth-order logic. It deals with propositions (which can be true or false) and relations between propositions, including the construction of arguments based on them. Compound propositions are formed by connecting propositions by logical connectives. Propositions that contain no logical connectives are called atomic propositions.

Unlike first-order logic, propositional logic does not deal with non-logical objects, predicates about them, or quantifiers. However, all the machinery of propositional logic is included in first-order logic and higher-order logics. In this sense, propositional logic is the foundation of first-order logic and higher-order logic.

Explanation
Logical connectives are found in natural languages. In English for example, some examples are "and" (conjunction), "or" (disjunction),  "not" (negation) and "if" (but only when used to denote material conditional).

The following is an example of a very simple inference within the scope of propositional logic:

Premise 1: If it's raining then it's cloudy.
Premise 2: It's raining.
Conclusion: It's cloudy.

Both premises and the conclusion are propositions. The premises are taken for granted, and with the application of modus ponens (an inference rule), the conclusion follows.

As propositional logic is not concerned with the structure of propositions beyond the point where they can't be decomposed any more by logical connectives, this inference can be restated replacing those atomic statements with statement letters, which are interpreted as variables representing statements:

Premise 1: 
Premise 2: 
Conclusion: 

The same can be stated succinctly in the following way:

Not only that, but they will also correspond with any other inference of this form, which will be valid on the same basis this inference is.

Propositional logic may be studied through a formal system in which formulas of a formal language may be interpreted to represent propositions. A system of axioms and inference rules allows certain formulas to be derived. These derived formulas are called theorems and may be interpreted to be true propositions. A constructed sequence of such formulas is known as a derivation or proof and the last formula of the sequence is the theorem. The derivation may be interpreted as proof of the proposition represented by the theorem.

The natural language propositions that arise when they're interpreted are outside the scope of the system, and the relation between the formal system and its interpretation is likewise outside the formal system itself.

In classical truth-functional propositional logic, formulas are interpreted as having precisely one of two possible truth values, the truth value of true or the truth value of false. The principle of bivalence and the law of excluded middle are upheld. Truth-functional propositional logic defined as such and systems isomorphic to it are considered to be zeroth-order logic. However, alternative propositional logics are also possible. For more, see Other logical calculi below.

History

Although propositional logic (which is interchangeable with propositional calculus) had been hinted by earlier philosophers, it was developed into a formal logic (Stoic logic) by Chrysippus in the 3rd century BC and expanded by his successor Stoics. The logic was focused on propositions. This advancement was different from the traditional syllogistic logic, which was focused on terms. However, most of the original writings were lost and the propositional logic developed by the Stoics was no longer understood later in antiquity. Consequently, the system was essentially reinvented by Peter Abelard in the 12th century.

Propositional logic was eventually refined using symbolic logic. The 17th/18th-century mathematician Gottfried Leibniz has been credited with being the founder of symbolic logic for his work with the calculus ratiocinator. Although his work was the first of its kind, it was unknown to the larger logical community. Consequently, many of the advances achieved by Leibniz were recreated by logicians like George Boole and Augustus De Morgan—completely independent of Leibniz.

Just as propositional logic can be considered an advancement from the earlier syllogistic logic, Gottlob Frege's predicate logic can be also considered an advancement from the earlier propositional logic. One author describes predicate logic as combining "the distinctive features of syllogistic logic and propositional logic." Consequently, predicate logic ushered in a new era in logic's history; however, advances in propositional logic were still made after Frege, including natural deduction, truth trees and truth tables. Natural deduction was invented by Gerhard Gentzen and Jan Łukasiewicz. Truth trees were invented by Evert Willem Beth. The invention of truth tables, however, is of uncertain attribution.

Within works by Frege and Bertrand Russell, are ideas influential to the invention of truth tables. The actual tabular structure (being formatted as a table), itself, is generally credited to either Ludwig Wittgenstein or Emil Post (or both, independently). Besides Frege and Russell, others credited with having ideas preceding truth tables include Philo, Boole, Charles Sanders Peirce, and Ernst Schröder. Others credited with the tabular structure include Jan Łukasiewicz, Alfred North Whitehead, William Stanley Jevons, John Venn, and Clarence Irving Lewis. Ultimately, some have concluded, like John Shosky, that "It is far from clear that any one person should be given the title of 'inventor' of truth-tables.".

Terminology
In general terms, a calculus is a formal system that consists of a set of syntactic expressions (well-formed formulas), a distinguished subset of these expressions (axioms), plus a set of formal rules that define a specific binary relation, intended to be interpreted as logical equivalence, on the space of expressions.

When the formal system is intended to be a logical system, the expressions are meant to be interpreted as statements, and the rules, known to be inference rules, are typically intended to be truth-preserving. In this setting, the rules, which may include axioms, can then be used to derive ("infer") formulas representing true statements—from given formulas representing true statements.

The set of axioms may be empty, a nonempty finite set, or a countably infinite set (see axiom schema). A formal grammar recursively defines the expressions and well-formed formulas of the language. In addition a semantics may be given which defines truth and valuations (or interpretations).

The language of a propositional calculus consists of
 a set of primitive symbols, variously referred to as atomic formulas, placeholders, proposition letters, or variables, and
 a set of operator symbols, variously interpreted as logical operators or logical connectives.

A well-formed formula is any atomic formula, or any formula that can be built up from atomic formulas by means of operator symbols according to the rules of the grammar.

Mathematicians sometimes distinguish between propositional constants, propositional variables, and schemata. Propositional constants represent some particular proposition, while propositional variables range over the set of all atomic propositions. Schemata, however, range over all propositions.

Basic concepts
The following outlines a standard propositional calculus. Many different formulations exist which are all more or less equivalent, but differ in the details of:
 their language (i.e., the particular collection of primitive symbols and operator symbols),
 the set of axioms, or distinguished formulas, and
 the set of inference rules.

Any given proposition may be represented with a letter called a 'propositional constant', analogous to representing a number by a letter in mathematics (e.g.). All propositions require exactly one of two truth-values:  true or false. For example, let  be the proposition that it is raining outside. This will be true if it is raining outside, and false otherwise.

In the example above,  expresses that it is not raining outside, or by a more standard reading: "It is not the case that it is raining outside." When  is true,  is false; and when  is false,  is true.
We read  as " and ". For any two propositions, there are four possible assignments of truth values:
If it is not raining outside, then  is false; and if there is no cold-front over Kansas, then  is also false.
Disjunction resembles conjunction in that it forms a proposition out of two simpler propositions. We write it , and it is read " or ". Using the example above, the disjunction expresses that it is either raining outside, or there is a cold front over Kansas. (Note, this use of disjunction is supposed to resemble the use of the English word "or". However, it is most like the English inclusive "or", which can be used to express the truth of at least one of two propositions. It is not like the English exclusive "or", which expresses the truth of exactly one of two propositions. An example of the exclusive or is: You may have a bagel or a pastry, but not both. Often in natural language, given the appropriate context, the addendum "but not both" is omitted—but implied. In mathematics, however, "or" is always inclusive or; if exclusive or is meant it will be specified, possibly by "xor".)
Material conditional also joins two simpler propositions, and we write , which is read "if  then ".  The proposition to the left of the arrow is called the antecedent, and the proposition to the right is called the consequent. (There is no such designation for conjunction or disjunction, since they are commutative operations.) It expresses that  is true whenever  is true. Thus  is true in every case above except case 2, because this is the only case when  is true but  is not. Using the example, if  then  expresses that if it is raining outside, then there is a cold-front over Kansas. The material conditional is often confused with physical causation. The material conditional, however, only relates two propositions by their truth-values—which is not the relation of cause and effect. It is contentious in the literature whether the material implication represents logical causation.
Biconditional joins two simpler propositions, and we write , which is read " if and only if ". It expresses that  and  have the same truth-value, and in cases 1 and 4. ' is true if and only if ' is true, and is false otherwise.

It is very helpful to look at the truth tables for these different operators, as well as the method of analytic tableaux.

Closure under operations
Propositional logic is closed under truth-functional connectives. That is to say, for any proposition ,  is also a proposition. This implies that, for instance,  is a proposition, and so it can be conjoined with another proposition. In order to represent this, we need to use parentheses to indicate which proposition is conjoined with which. By evaluating the truth conditions, we see that both expressions have the same truth conditions (will be true in the same cases), and moreover that any proposition formed by arbitrary conjunctions will have the same truth conditions, regardless of the location of the parentheses. This means that conjunction is associative, however, one should not assume that parentheses never serve a purpose. One can verify this by the truth-table method referenced above.

Note:  For any arbitrary number of propositional constants, we can form a finite number of cases which list their possible truth-values. Below this list, one writes  rows, and below  one fills in the first half of the rows with true (or T) and the second half with false (or F). Below  one fills in one-quarter of the rows with T, then one-quarter with F, then one-quarter with T and the last quarter with F.  The next column alternates between true and false for each eighth of the rows, then sixteenths, and so on, until the last propositional constant varies between T and F for each row. This will give a complete listing of cases or truth-value assignments possible for those propositional constants.

Argument
The propositional calculus then defines an argument to be a list of propositions.  A valid argument is a list of propositions, the last of which follows from—or is implied by—the rest.  All other arguments are invalid.  The simplest valid argument is modus ponens, one instance of which is the following list of propositions:

This is a list of three propositions, each line is a proposition, and the last follows from the rest. The first two lines are called premises, and the last line the conclusion. We say that any proposition  follows from any set of propositions , if  must be true whenever every member of the set  is true. Notice that, when  is true, we cannot consider cases 3 and 4 (from the truth table). When  is true, we cannot consider case 2. Thus  is implied by the premises.

This generalizes schematically.  Thus, where  and  may be any propositions at all,

Other argument forms are convenient, but not necessary.  Given a complete set of axioms (see below for one such set), modus ponens is sufficient to prove all other argument forms in propositional logic, thus they may be considered to be a derivative.  Note, this is not true of the extension of propositional logic to other logics like first-order logic.  First-order logic requires at least one additional rule of inference in order to obtain completeness.

The significance of argument in formal logic is that one may obtain new truths from established truths. After the argument is made,  is deduced. In this way, we define a deduction system to be a set of all propositions that may be deduced from another set of propositions. Reiteration is always assumed, so . Because we have not included sufficiently complete axioms, though, nothing else may be deduced. Thus, even though most deduction systems studied in propositional logic are able to deduce , this one is too weak to prove such a proposition.

Generic description of a propositional calculus
A propositional calculus is a formal system , where:

Repeated applications of these rules permits the construction of complex formulas. For example:
 By rule 1,  is a formula.
 By rule 2,  is a formula.
 By rule 1,  is a formula.
 By rule 2,  is a formula.

Example 1. Simple axiom system

 The set , the countably infinite set of symbols that serve to represent logical propositions:
 
 The functionally complete set  of logical operators (logical connectives and negation) is as follows. Of the three connectives for conjunction, disjunction, and implication (and ), one can be taken as primitive and the other two can be defined in terms of it and negation. Alternatively, all of the logical operators may be defined in terms of a sole sufficient operator, such as the Sheffer stroke (nand). Adopting negation and implication as the two primitive operations of a propositional calculus is tantamount to having the omega set  partition as follows:
 
 
 The set  (the set of initial points of logical deduction, i.e., logical axioms) is the axiom system proposed by Jan Łukasiewicz, and used as the propositional-calculus part of a Hilbert system. The axioms are all substitution instances of:
 
 
 

This system is used in Metamath set.mm formal proof database.

Example 2. Natural deduction system

 The alpha set , is a countably infinite set of symbols, for example:
 
 The omega set  partitions as follows:
 
 

In the following example of a propositional calculus, the transformation rules are intended to be interpreted as the inference rules of a so-called natural deduction system. The particular system presented here has no initial points, which means that its interpretation for logical applications derives its theorems from an empty axiom set.

 The set of initial points is empty, that is, .
 The set of transformation rules, is described as follows:

Our propositional calculus has eleven inference rules. These rules allow us to derive other true formulas given a set of formulas that are assumed to be true. The first ten simply state that we can infer certain well-formed formulas from other well-formed formulas. The last rule however uses hypothetical reasoning in the sense that in the premise of the rule we temporarily assume an (unproven) hypothesis to be part of the set of inferred formulas to see if we can infer a certain other formula. Since the first ten rules don't do this they are usually described as non-hypothetical rules, and the last one as a hypothetical rule.

In describing the transformation rules, we may introduce a metalanguage symbol . It is basically a convenient shorthand for saying "infer that". Note that considering the following rule Conjunction introduction, we will know whenever  has more than one formula, we can always safely reduce it into one formula using conjunction. So for short, from that time on we may represent  as one formula instead of a set. Another omission for convenience is when  is an empty set, in which case  may not appear.

 That is, .
 Negation elimination From , infer .
 That is, .
 Double negation elimination From , infer .
 That is, .
 That is, .
 Conjunction elimination From , infer .
 From , infer .
 Disjunction introduction From , infer .
 From , infer .
 That is, .
 That is, .
Biconditional elimination From , infer .
 From , infer .
 That is, .
 Conditional proof (conditional introduction)  From [accepting  allows a proof of ], infer .
 That is, .

Basic and derived argument forms

Proofs in propositional calculus
One of the main uses of a propositional calculus, when interpreted for logical applications, is to determine relations of logical equivalence between propositional formulas. These relationships are determined by means of the available transformation rules, sequences of which are called derivations or proofs.

In the discussion to follow, a proof is presented as a sequence of numbered lines, with each line consisting of a single formula followed by a reason or justification for introducing that formula. Each premise of the argument, that is, an assumption introduced as an hypothesis of the argument, is listed at the beginning of the sequence and is marked as a "premise" in lieu of other justification. The conclusion is listed on the last line. A proof is complete if every line follows from the previous ones by the correct application of a transformation rule. (For a contrasting approach, see proof-trees).

Example of a proof in natural deduction system
 To be shown that .
 One possible proof of this (which, though valid, happens to contain more steps than are necessary) may be arranged as follows:

Interpret  as "Assuming , infer ". Read  as "Assuming nothing, infer that  implies ", or "It is a tautology that  implies ", or "It is always true that  implies ".

Example of a proof in a classical propositional calculus system
We now prove the same theorem  in the axiomatic system by Jan Łukasiewicz described above, which is an example of a Hilbert-style deductive system for the classical propositional calculus.

The axioms are:
(A1) 
(A2) 
(A3) 

And the proof is as follows:
        (instance of (A1))
        (instance of (A2))
        (from (1) and (2) by modus ponens)
        (instance of (A1))
        (from (4) and (3) by modus ponens)

Soundness and completeness of the rules
The crucial properties of this set of rules are that they are sound and complete. Informally this means that the rules are correct and that no other rules are required. These claims can be made more formal as follows.
Note that the proofs for the soundness and completeness of the propositional logic are not themselves proofs in propositional logic ; these are theorems in ZFC used as a metatheory to prove properties of propositional logic.

We define a truth assignment as a function that maps propositional variables to true or false. Informally such a truth assignment can be understood as the description of a possible state of affairs (or possible world) where certain statements are true and others are not. The semantics of formulas can then be formalized by defining for which "state of affairs" they are considered to be true, which is what is done by the following definition.

We define when such a truth assignment  satisfies a certain well-formed formula with the following rules:
  satisfies the propositional variable  if and only if 
  satisfies  if and only if  does not satisfy 
  satisfies  if and only if  satisfies both  and 
  satisfies  if and only if  satisfies at least one of either  or 
  satisfies  if and only if it is not the case that  satisfies  but not 

With this definition we can now formalize what it means for a formula  to be implied by a certain set  of formulas. Informally this is true if in all worlds that are possible given the set of formulas  the formula  also holds. This leads to the following formal definition: We say that a set  of well-formed formulas semantically entails (or implies) a certain well-formed formula  if all truth assignments that satisfy all the formulas in  also satisfy .

Finally we define syntactical entailment such that  is syntactically entailed by  if and only if we can derive it with the inference rules that were presented above in a finite number of steps. This allows us to formulate exactly what it means for the set of inference rules to be sound and complete:

Soundness: If the set of well-formed formulas  syntactically entails the well-formed formula  then  semantically entails .

Completeness: If the set of well-formed formulas  semantically entails the well-formed formula  then  syntactically entails .

For the above set of rules this is indeed the case.

Sketch of a soundness proof
(For most logical systems, this is the comparatively "simple" direction of proof)

Notational conventions: Let  be a variable ranging over sets of sentences. Let  and  range over sentences. For " syntactically entails " we write " proves ". For " semantically entails " we write " implies ".

We want to show:  (if  proves , then  implies ).

We note that " proves " has an inductive definition, and that gives us the immediate resources for demonstrating claims of the form "If  proves , then ...". So our proof proceeds by induction.

Notice that Basis Step II can be omitted for natural deduction systems because they have no axioms. When used, Step II involves showing that each of the axioms is a (semantic) logical truth.

(The proof is simple, since the semantic fact that a set implies any of its members, is also trivial.) The Inductive step will systematically cover all the further sentences that might be provable—by considering each case where we might reach a logical conclusion using an inference rule—and shows that if a new sentence is provable, it is also logically implied. (For example, we might have a rule telling us that from "" we can derive " or ". In III.a We assume that if  is provable it is implied. We also know that if  is provable then " or " is provable. We have to show that then " or " too is implied. So any semantic valuation making all of  true makes  true. But any valuation making  true makes " or " true, by the defined semantics for "or". So any valuation which makes all of  true makes " or " true. So " or " is implied.) Generally, the Inductive step will consist of a lengthy but simple case-by-case analysis of all the rules of inference, showing that each "preserves" semantic implication.

Sketch of completeness proof
(This is usually the much harder direction of proof.)

We adopt the same notational conventions as above.

We want to show: If  implies , then  proves . We proceed by contraposition: We show instead that if  does not prove  then  does not imply . If we show that there is a model where  does not hold despite  being true, then obviously  does not imply . The idea is to build such a model out of our very assumption that  does not prove .

Thus every system that has modus ponens as an inference rule, and proves the following theorems (including substitutions thereof) is complete:
 
 
 
 
 
 
 
 

The first five are used for the satisfaction of the five conditions in stage III above, and the last three for proving the deduction theorem.

Example
As an example, it can be shown that as any other tautology, the three axioms of the classical propositional calculus system described earlier can be proven in any system that satisfies the above, namely that has modus ponens as an inference rule, and proves the above eight theorems (including substitutions thereof). Out of the eight theorems, the last two are two of the three axioms; the third axiom, can be proven as well, as we now show.

For the proof we may use the hypothetical syllogism theorem (in the form relevant for this axiomatic system), since it only relies on the two axioms that are already in the above set of eight theorems.
The proof then is as follows:
         (instance of the 7th theorem)
         (instance of the 7th theorem)
         (from (1) and (2) by modus ponens)
         (instance of the hypothetical syllogism theorem)
         (instance of the 5th theorem)
         (from (5) and (4) by modus ponens)
         (instance of the 2nd theorem)
         (instance of the 7th theorem)
         (from (7) and (8) by modus ponens)
 
        (instance of the 8th theorem)
        (from (9) and (10) by modus ponens)
         (from (3) and (11) by modus ponens)
         (instance of the 8th theorem)
         (from (12) and (13) by modus ponens)
          (from (6) and (14) by modus ponens)

Verifying completeness for the classical propositional calculus system
We now verify that the classical propositional calculus system described earlier can indeed prove the required eight theorems mentioned above. We use several lemmas proven here:
 (DN1)  - Double negation (one direction)
 (DN2)  - Double negation (another direction)
 (HS1)  - one form of Hypothetical syllogism
 (HS2)  - another form of Hypothetical syllogism
 (TR1)  - Transposition
(TR2)  - another form of transposition.
(L1) 
(L3) 
We also use the method of the hypothetical syllogism metatheorem as a shorthand for several proof steps.

  - proof:
         (instance of (A1))
         (instance of (TR1))
         (from (1) and (2) using the hypothetical syllogism metatheorem)
         (instance of (DN1))
         (instance of (HS1))
         (from (4) and (5) using modus ponens)
         (from (3) and (6) using the hypothetical syllogism metatheorem)
  - proof:
         (instance of (HS1))
         (instance of (L3))
         (instance of (HS1))
         (from (2) and (3) by modus ponens)
         (from (1) and (4) using the hypothetical syllogism metatheorem)
         (instance of (TR2))
         (instance of (HS2))
         (from (6) and (7) using modus ponens)
         (from (5) and (8) using the hypothetical syllogism metatheorem)
  - proof:
         (instance of (A1))
         (instance of (A1))
         (from (1) and (2) using modus ponens)
  - proof:
         (instance of (L1))
         (instance of (TR1))
         (from (1) and (2) using the hypothetical syllogism metatheorem)
  - proof:
         (instance of (A1))
         (instance of (A3))
         (from (1) and (2) using the hypothetical syllogism metatheorem)
  - proof given in the proof example above
  - axiom (A1)
  - axiom (A2)

Another outline for a completeness proof
If a formula is a tautology, then there is a truth table for it which shows that each valuation yields the value true for the formula. Consider such a valuation. By mathematical induction on the length of the subformulas, show that the truth or falsity of the subformula follows from the truth or falsity (as appropriate for the valuation) of each propositional variable in the subformula. Then combine the lines of the truth table together two at a time by using "( is true implies ) implies (( is false implies ) implies )". Keep repeating this until all dependencies on propositional variables have been eliminated. The result is that we have proved the given tautology. Since every tautology is provable, the logic is complete.

Interpretation of a truth-functional propositional calculus
An interpretation of a truth-functional propositional calculus may also be expressed in terms of truth tables.

For  distinct propositional symbols there are  distinct possible interpretations. For any particular symbol , for example, there are  possible interpretations:
  is assigned T, or
  is assigned F.
For the pair ,  there are  possible interpretations:
 both are assigned T,
 both are assigned F,

Interpretation of a sentence of truth-functional propositional logic

 A sentence of propositional logic is true under an interpretation  if  assigns the truth value T to that sentence. If a sentence is true under an interpretation, then that interpretation is called a model of that sentence.
  is false under an interpretation  if  is not true under .
 A sentence of propositional logic is logically valid if it is true under every interpretation.
   means that  is logically valid.
 A sentence of propositional logic is consistent if it is true under at least one interpretation. It is inconsistent if it is not consistent.

Some consequences of these definitions:

 For any given interpretation a given formula is either true or false.
 No formula is both true and false under the same interpretation.
  is true under    is not true under .
 A sentence  of propositional logic is a semantic consequence of a sentence    is logically valid, that is,   .

Alternative calculus
It is possible to define another version of propositional calculus, which defines most of the syntax of the logical operators by means of axioms, and which uses only one inference rule.

Axioms
(The well-formed formulas themselves would not contain any Greek letters, but only capital Roman letters, connective operators, and parentheses.) Then the axioms are as follows:

Axiom  may be considered to be a "distributive property of implication with respect to implication."
Axioms  and  correspond to "conjunction elimination".
Axiom  corresponds to "conjunction introduction."
Axioms  and  correspond to "disjunction introduction."
Axiom  corresponds to "reductio ad absurdum."
Axiom  says that "anything can be deduced from a contradiction."
Axiom  is called "tertium non-datur" (Latin: "a third is not given") and reflects the semantic valuation of propositional formulas: a formula can have a truth-value of either true or false. There is no third truth-value, at least not in classical logic. Intuitionistic logicians do not accept the axiom .

Inference rule
The inference rule is modus ponens:
.

Meta-inference rule
Let a demonstration be represented by a sequence, with hypotheses to the left of the turnstile and the conclusion to the right of the turnstile. Then the deduction theorem can be stated as follows:
 If the sequence

 has been demonstrated, then it is also possible to demonstrate the sequence
.

This deduction theorem (DT) is not itself formulated with propositional calculus: it is not a theorem of propositional calculus, but a theorem about propositional calculus. In this sense, it is a meta-theorem, comparable to theorems about the soundness or completeness of propositional calculus.

On the other hand, DT is so useful for simplifying the syntactical proof process that it can be considered and used as another inference rule, accompanying modus ponens. In this sense, DT corresponds to the natural conditional proof inference rule which is part of the first version of propositional calculus introduced in this article.

The converse of DT is also valid:
 If the sequence

 has been demonstrated, then it is also possible to demonstrate the sequence

in fact, the validity of the converse of DT is almost trivial compared to that of DT:
 If
 
 then
 1: 
 2: 
 and from (1) and (2) can be deduced
 3: 
 by means of modus ponens, Q.E.D.

The converse of DT has powerful implications: it can be used to convert an axiom into an inference rule. For example, by axiom AND-1 we have,
 
which can be transformed by means of the converse of the deduction theorem into
 
which tells us that the inference rule
 
is admissible. This inference rule is conjunction elimination, one of the ten inference rules used in the first version (in this article) of the propositional calculus.

Example of a proof
The following is an example of a (syntactical) demonstration, involving only axioms  and :

Prove:  (Reflexivity of implication).

Proof:
 
 Axiom  with 
 
 Axiom  with 
 
 From (1) and (2) by modus ponens.
 
 Axiom  with 
 
 From (3) and (4) by modus ponens.

Equivalence to equational logics
The preceding alternative calculus is an example of a Hilbert-style deduction system. In the case of propositional systems the axioms are terms built with logical connectives and the only inference rule is modus ponens. Equational logic as standardly used informally in high school algebra is a different kind of calculus from Hilbert systems. Its theorems are equations and its inference rules express the properties of equality, namely that it is a congruence on terms that admits substitution.

Classical propositional calculus as described above is equivalent to Boolean algebra, while intuitionistic propositional calculus is equivalent to Heyting algebra. The equivalence is shown by translation in each direction of the theorems of the respective systems. Theorems  of classical or intuitionistic propositional calculus are translated as equations  of Boolean or Heyting algebra respectively.

In both Boolean and Heyting algebra, inequality  can be used in place of equality. The significance of inequality for Hilbert-style systems is that it corresponds to the latter's deduction or entailment symbol . An entailment

is translated in the inequality version of the algebraic framework as

Conversely the algebraic inequality  is translated as the entailment
.

Internal implication between two terms is another term of the same kind. Entailment as external implication between two terms expresses a metatruth outside the language of the logic, and is considered part of the metalanguage. Even when the logic under study is intuitionistic, entailment is ordinarily understood classically as two-valued: either the left side entails, or is less-or-equal to, the right side, or it is not.

Similar but more complex translations to and from algebraic logics are possible for natural deduction systems as described above and for the sequent calculus. The entailments of the latter can be interpreted as two-valued, but a more insightful interpretation is as a set, the elements of which can be understood as abstract proofs organized as the morphisms of a category. In this interpretation the cut rule of the sequent calculus corresponds to composition in the category. Boolean and Heyting algebras enter this picture as special categories having at most one morphism per homset, i.e., one proof per entailment, corresponding to the idea that existence of proofs is all that matters: any proof will do and there is no point in distinguishing them.

Graphical calculi

It is possible to generalize the definition of a formal language from a set of finite sequences over a finite basis to include many other sets of mathematical structures, so long as they are built up by finitary means from finite materials. What's more, many of these families of formal structures are especially well-suited for use in logic.

For example, there are many families of graphs that are close enough analogues of formal languages that the concept of a calculus is quite easily and naturally extended to them. Many species of graphs arise as parse graphs in the syntactic analysis of the corresponding families of text structures. The exigencies of practical computation on formal languages frequently demand that text strings be converted into pointer structure renditions of parse graphs, simply as a matter of checking whether strings are well-formed formulas or not. Once this is done, there are many advantages to be gained from developing the graphical analogue of the calculus on strings. The mapping from strings to parse graphs is called parsing and the inverse mapping from parse graphs to strings is achieved by an operation that is called traversing the graph.

Other logical calculi
Propositional calculus is about the simplest kind of logical calculus in current use. It can be extended in several ways. (Aristotelian "syllogistic" calculus, which is largely supplanted in modern logic, is in some ways simpler – but in other ways more complex – than propositional calculus.) The most immediate way to develop a more complex logical calculus is to introduce rules that are sensitive to more fine-grained details of the sentences being used.

First-order logic (a.k.a. first-order predicate logic) results when the "atomic sentences" of propositional logic are broken up into terms, variables, predicates, and quantifiers, all keeping the rules of propositional logic with some new ones introduced. (For example, from "All dogs are mammals" we may infer "If Rover is a dog then Rover is a mammal".) With the tools of first-order logic it is possible to formulate a number of theories, either with explicit axioms or by rules of inference, that can themselves be treated as logical calculi. Arithmetic is the best known of these; others include set theory and mereology. Second-order logic and other higher-order logics are formal extensions of first-order logic. Thus, it makes sense to refer to propositional logic as "zeroth-order logic", when comparing it with these logics.

Modal logic also offers a variety of inferences that cannot be captured in propositional calculus. For example, from "Necessarily " we may infer that . From  we may infer "It is possible that ". The translation between modal logics and algebraic logics concerns classical and intuitionistic logics but with the introduction of a unary operator on Boolean or Heyting algebras, different from the Boolean operations, interpreting the possibility modality, and in the case of Heyting algebra a second operator interpreting necessity (for Boolean algebra this is redundant since necessity is the De Morgan dual of possibility). The first operator preserves 0 and disjunction while the second preserves 1 and conjunction.

Many-valued logics are those allowing sentences to have values other than true and false. (For example, neither and both are standard "extra values"; "continuum logic" allows each sentence to have any of an infinite number of "degrees of truth" between true and false.) These logics often require calculational devices quite distinct from propositional calculus. When the values form a Boolean algebra (which may have more than two or even infinitely many values), many-valued logic reduces to classical logic; many-valued logics are therefore only of independent interest when the values form an algebra that is not Boolean.

Solvers
One notable difference between propositional calculus and predicate calculus is that satisfiability of a propositional formula is decidable. Deciding satisfiability of propositional logic formulas is an NP-complete problem. However, practical methods exist (e.g., DPLL algorithm, 1962; Chaff algorithm, 2001) that are very fast for many useful cases. Recent work has extended the SAT solver algorithms to work with propositions containing arithmetic expressions; these are the SMT solvers.

See also

Higher logical levels
 First-order logic
 Second-order propositional logic
 Second-order logic
 Higher-order logic

Related topics

 Boolean algebra (logic)
 Boolean algebra (structure)
 Boolean algebra topics
 Boolean domain
 Boolean function
 Boolean-valued function
 Categorical logic
 Combinational logic
 Combinatory logic
 Conceptual graph
 Disjunctive syllogism
 Entitative graph
 Equational logic
 Existential graph
 Frege's propositional calculus
 Implicational propositional calculus
 Intuitionistic propositional calculus
 Jean Buridan 
 Laws of Form
 List of logic symbols
 Logical graph
 Logical NOR
 Logical value
 Mathematical logic
 Operation (mathematics)
 Paul of Venice 
 Peirce's law
 Peter of Spain (author) 
 Propositional formula
 Symmetric difference
 Tautology (rule of inference)
 Truth function 
 Truth table
 Walter Burley 
 William of Sherwood

References

Further reading
 Brown, Frank Markham (2003), Boolean Reasoning: The Logic of Boolean Equations, 1st edition, Kluwer Academic Publishers, Norwell, MA. 2nd edition, Dover Publications, Mineola, NY.
 Chang, C.C. and Keisler, H.J. (1973), Model Theory, North-Holland, Amsterdam, Netherlands.
 Kohavi, Zvi (1978), Switching and Finite Automata Theory, 1st edition, McGraw–Hill, 1970. 2nd edition, McGraw–Hill, 1978.
 Korfhage, Robert R. (1974), Discrete Computational Structures, Academic Press, New York, NY.
 Lambek, J. and Scott, P.J. (1986), Introduction to Higher Order Categorical Logic, Cambridge University Press, Cambridge, UK.
 Mendelson, Elliot (1964), Introduction to Mathematical Logic, D. Van Nostrand Company.

Related works

External links

Klement, Kevin C. (2006), "Propositional Logic", in James Fieser and Bradley Dowden (eds.), Internet Encyclopedia of Philosophy, Eprint.
Formal Predicate Calculus, contains a systematic formal development along the lines of Alternative calculus
 forall x: an introduction to formal logic, by P.D. Magnus, covers formal semantics and proof theory for sentential logic.
Chapter 2 / Propositional Logic from Logic In Action
Propositional sequent calculus prover on Project Nayuki. (note: implication can be input in the form !X|Y, and a sequent can be a single formula prefixed with > and having no commas)
Propositional Logic - A Generative Grammar

 
Systems of formal logic
Logical calculi
Boolean algebra
Classical logic
Analytic philosophy